Volleyball events were contested at the 1966 Asian Games at Thammasat Gymnasium in Bangkok, Thailand from 10 December to 19 December 1966.

Medalists

Medal table

Final standing

Men

Women

References
 Men's Results
 Women's Results

External links
OCA official website

 
1966 Asian Games events
1966
Asian Games
Asian Games